Ololygon atrata is a species of frogs in the family Hylidae.

It is endemic to Brazil.
Its natural habitats are subtropical or tropical moist montane forests.

Sources

atrata
Endemic fauna of Brazil
Frogs of South America
Amphibians described in 1989
Taxonomy articles created by Polbot